The Limestone Umpire Association, or the LUA, is a localized softball umpire association that serves the Kingston, Ontario, Canada and surrounding regions.  Founded in 2014, it began as a small group that covered a local men's fastball league. For the 2015 softball season, the group quadrupled in size and began covering two men's fastball leagues, 3 surrounding areas' minor fastball programs as well as area slo pitch tournaments.

Sport in Kingston, Ontario
Organizations based in Kingston, Ontario
Softball organizations
Sports officiating
Softball in Canada
2014 establishments in Ontario